I Live Again (alternate title: Live Again) is a 1936 British musical film directed by Arthur Maude and starring Noah Beery, Bessie Love, and John Garrick. It was made at Rock Studios, Elstree.

Plot 
An aging opera star takes on a young protege.

Cast

References

External links 
 
 
 

1936 films
British musical films
British black-and-white films
1936 musical films
Films about opera
Films directed by Arthur Maude
Films shot at Rock Studios
1930s English-language films
1930s British films